Shaogongzhuang Subdistrict is a subdistrict located in the south of Hongqiao District, Tianjin, China. It borders Xigu Subdistrict to the north, Santiaoshi Subdistrict to the east, Jieyuan Subdistrict to the southeast, Changhong and Xiangyang Road Subdistrict to the south, as well as Xiyingmen and Heyuan Subdsitricts to the west. It had 54,413 inhabitants as of 2010.

The subdistrict was founded in 1952. Its name literally means "Mr. Shao‘s Manor’.

Geography 
Shaogongzhuang subdistrict situates north of the Nanyun River.

Administrative divisions 
At the end of 2021, Shaogongzhuang Subdistrict was divided into 13 residential communities. They are listed as follows:

See also 

 List of township-level divisions of Tianjin

References 

Township-level divisions of Tianjin
Hongqiao District, Tianjin